Haby Baldé (born 1 January 2000) is a Senegalese footballer who plays as a forward for US Parcelles Assainies and the Senegal women's national team.

Club career
Baldé has played for AFA Grand-Yoff and Parcelles Assainies in Dakar, Senegal.

International career
Baldé capped for Senegal at senior level during the 2022 Africa Women Cup of Nations qualification.

References

External links

2000 births
Living people
Senegalese women's footballers
Women's association football forwards
Senegal women's international footballers